General Luna may refer to:

Municipalities in the Philippines
General Luna, Quezon
General Luna, Surigao del Norte

People
Antonio Luna (1866–1899), general of the Philippine–American War, for whom the municipalities are named
Joaquim Silva e Luna (born 1949), retired four-star general of the Brazilian Army 
Cardozo Luna (born 1953), retired three-star general of the Armed Forces of the Philippines

Popular culture
Heneral Luna, 2015 film depicting Antonio Luna
General Luna (band), all female Filipino rock band